Miss Puerto Rico Universe 2008, The annual competition was held at the Centro de Bellas Artes in Santurce, televised live by Telemundo Puerto Rico. It was presented by Desirée Lowry and Osvaldo Ríos. Miss Puerto Rico Universe 2007, Uma Blasini of Guayanilla was succeeded by Ingrid Marie Rivera, from Dorado who won the Miss Puerto Rico Universe 2008 title on November 23, 2007. Music was performed by Puerto Rican singer Kany García. Rivera  represented Puerto Rico at the Miss Universe 2008 contest in Nha Trang, Vietnam, but did not reach the semifinals.

Placements

Special Awards

Contestants
Here is a list of the official 30 contestants.

Controversy
Conflict between the candidates and Pageant officials began when it was revealed that Ingrid Marie Rivera would be a candidate at this year's pageant. Prior to the Miss Puerto Rico Universe competition, Rivera had participated in several major beauty pageants. In 2005 she won the title of Miss Mundo de Puerto Rico (Miss Puerto Rico World) following her win she competed at the Miss World pageant placing 2nd runner-up and obtained the title of Miss Caribbean World. In 2003, she also held the title of Miss Global Queen. Rivera was also a judge at last year's Miss Puerto Rico Universe pageant won by Uma Blasini. Candidates were concerned about Rivera, they felt as if she should not be allowed to compete and feared that Rivera's previous pageant experience would favor her in the competition and help her win the pageant.

Pageant night
Rivera was booed by some members of the crowd in her swimsuit, evening gown and final question competitions. Despite it all Rivera won the title, although her victory is portrayed as an unfair win. Three days after the pageant was over an even bigger controversy arouse when it was revealed Rivera's belongings had been stolen while the competition was undergoing. Also Rivera's gown and makeup had been coated with pepper spray, causing redness and itchiness in her skin during the pageant. This incident has made headlines nationwide and is now being investigated by officers to determine who is responsible for this.

Evidence
At first police said tests showed no traces of capsicum, the pepper spray's active ingredient, disproving the alleged sabotage of Rivera's clothing during the competition. Police are now investigating and questioning if the alleged sabotage against Rivera is a true story or a publicity stunt. Rivera, pageant officials, and even Magali Febles who is the owner of the Miss Puerto Rico Universe organization could possibly be submitted to a lie detector test. The investigation continued for the next couple of weeks.
None of the participants have publicly admitted seeing Rivera with any type of reaction during the competition nor seeing anyone with a suspicious behavior that could lead to a suspect.  The delegates from the towns of Santurce, Guaynabo, Bayamón, Salinas, Fajardo and Utuado appeared on national television, on shows like "The Tyra Banks Show" and "The Today Show"  saying they were skeptical about the veracity of this incident since none of them knew anything about it until days after the pageant was over.
After a few weeks during the investigation, a swimsuit and a second gown were tested, and pepper spray was found.

Notes
Ingrid Rivera (Miss Dorado) previously held the title of Miss World Puerto Rico. Ingrid also placed 2nd Runner-up at the Miss World 2005 pageant where she obtained the title of Miss Caribbean.
Maribel Montalvo (Miss Utuado) later placed 2nd Runner-up at the Miss World Puerto Rico 2008 pageant.
Melissa Marty (Miss Caguas) later became Nuestra Belleza Latina 2008.
Kristina Ruisánchez (Miss Trujillo Alto) later became Miss Puerto Rico Continente Americano 2008 and placed 1st Runner-up at the Miss Continente Americano 2008 pageant.

References

Interviews in the miss universe 2008

2007 in Puerto Rico
Puerto Rico 2008
2008 beauty pageants